Aero 2000 S.A., d/b/a LATAM Airlines Argentina, formerly LAN Argentina, was an airline based in Buenos Aires, Argentina, and a member of the LATAM Airlines Group.

History
Prior to its acquisition by LAN Airlines, the airline was known by its legal name, Aero 2000. LAN Argentina became an affiliate member of the Oneworld airline alliance on April 1, 2007, but left on May 1, 2020. The airline was owned by LATAM Airlines Group (49%) and Argentine investors (51%).

On August 28, 2013, an Argentine judge blocked the government's plan to break a long-term lease of hangar space to LAN in Aeroparque Jorge Newbery, which was seen as vital to the airline's operations.

As its parent company, LAN merged with TAM Linhas Aéreas and rebranded to form LATAM Airlines, LAN Argentina also rebranded to LATAM Argentina.

LATAM Airlines agreed to pay more than $22 million in civil and criminal fines relating to a decade-old Argentine bribery case. The U.S. Securities and Exchange Commission said the fine of LATAM related to "improper payments it authorized during a dispute between the airline and its union employees in Argentina". LAN was accused of using an Argentine consultant to negotiate with unions on the company's behalf and paid the consultant via a sham contract that channeled funds to corrupt union officials. The scheme had violated the accounting provisions of the Foreign Corrupt Practices Act, the U.S. Justice Department said, and the airline agreed to pay a $12.75 million criminal penalty. It will pay a further $9.4 million, including interest, to settle the SEC's charges of inadequate accounting controls.

On June 17, 2020, LATAM Argentina's parent, the LATAM Airlines Group, announced it would cease operations of the subsidiary, with all aircraft returned to lessors and all employees laid off immediately.

Destinations

LATAM Argentina operated scheduled domestic services from Buenos Aires to Bariloche, Córdoba, Comodoro Rivadavia, El Calafate, Mendoza, Puerto Iguazú, Neuquén, Río Gallegos, Salta, San Juan, Tucumán and Ushuaia,  and international services to Lima, Miami, Punta del Este, Santiago and Sao Paulo. Its main bases were Jorge Newbery Airport for its short-haul operations and Ministro Pistarini International Airport for its long-haul operations, both located in Buenos Aires.

Fleet

At the time the airline ceased operations in June 2020, LATAM Argentina's fleet consisted of the following aircraft:

Retired fleet
LATAM Argentina previously operated the following aircraft:

See also
List of defunct airlines of Argentina

References

External links

Defunct airlines of Argentina
Airlines established in 2005
2020 disestablishments in Argentina
Airlines disestablished in 2020
A
Former Oneworld affiliate members
Argentine companies established in 2005